Hieracium longiberbe, known by the common name longbeard hawkweed, is a rare North American plant species in the tribe Cichorieae within the family Asteraceae It has been found only in the Columbia River Gorge along the border between the states of Washington and Oregon in the northwestern United States.

One stalk will produce 3-12 flower heads in a flat-topped array. Each head has 12-24 yellow ray flowers but no disc flowers.

References

External links
Paul Slichter, Hawkweeds of the Columbia River Gorge of Oregon and Washington, Longbeard Hawkweed, Long-bearded Hawkweed, Hieracium longiberbe several photos

longiberbe
Flora of the Northwestern United States
Plants described in 1901
Flora without expected TNC conservation status